Janet Steiger (June 10, 1939, in Oshkosh, Wisconsin – April 3, 2004, in Fort Myers, Florida) was an American politician.

Biography
Steiger graduated from Lawrence University in Appleton, Wisconsin. On August 10, 1963, she married William A. Steiger, who was elected to the United States House of Representatives.  They had one son, William R. Steiger, who was the subject of controversy for his role in the politicization of science during the George W. Bush administration.

A member of the Republican Party, she was chairman of the Postal Rate Commission from 1981 to 1989 and chairperson of the Federal Trade Commission from August 11, 1989 to April 11, 1995. She was the first woman to serve as FTC Chair.

See also 
 List of former FTC commissioners

References

External links
ABA biography
Chairpersons and commissioners of the FTC

1939 births
2004 deaths
Politicians from Oshkosh, Wisconsin
Lawrence University alumni
Federal Trade Commission personnel
Wisconsin Republicans
20th-century American women politicians
20th-century American politicians
George H. W. Bush administration personnel
Clinton administration personnel
21st-century American women